La Trenche Generating Station is a hydroelectric power plant on the Saint-Maurice River and within La Tuque, in Upper-Mauricie, in the administrative region of Mauricie, in Quebec, in Canada. Its construction was completed in 1950. This power station was put into service immediately. It is the central sixth to block the river from its mouth. With its , it is the most powerful. Hydro-Québec acquired La Trenche power from the Shawinigan Water & Power Company.

Its retaining capacity is 6 million cubic meters of water at the outlet of Tourouvre lake. The lake is formed by a widening of the Saint-Maurice River because the dam receives water from the Trenche River.

Toponymy 
The dam is named after the Trenche River.

The name "Tranche Dam" was officially registered on June 6, 2001, in the Bank of place names of the Commission de toponymie du Québec (Geographical Names Board of Québec).

Images

See also 

 Trenche River
 La Tuque, Quebec
 Mauricie
 Saint-Maurice River

References

External links 
 Central Trenche
 Dam Trenche

Dams completed in 1950
Energy infrastructure completed in 1950
Dams in Quebec
La Tuque, Quebec
Buildings and structures in Mauricie
Run-of-the-river power stations